This is a list of seasons played by Cefn Druids and the various other clubs who the current club, formed in 1992, is descended from. It starts from the 1876–77 season, when the earliest ancestor club, Ruabon Druids FC began playing in competitive fixtures, to the most recent current season.

History
It was reported that on October 6, 1872 the opening game of a Football Club for the district was played at Plasmadoc Park. Mr George Hampden Whalley was selected as the captain of the club. Whalley would later become club President.

It is claimed by the later successor club that Druids FC formed in 1872 when Plasmadoc FC merged with Ruabon Rovers and Ruabon Volunteers under the guidance of Llewelyn Kenrick.  Contemporary sources refute this version of events, as in February 1873 Ruabon Rovers played a fixture against Ruabon Volunteers, which shows these clubs were both still Active after the proposed merger date. Ruabon Volunteers were also known as the 2nd Denbighshire Volunteers so were actually a Military team.

In September 1873 the club was still known as Ruabon Rovers as evidenced in the annual meeting of the club, where a number of influential people, later associated with Druids were present and held key roles, such as David and George Thomson. The issue of the club's foundation is further muddied when Llewelyn Kenrick was present at the founding of a football club in Ruabon in September 1873.

The name of the club appears interchangeable between Ruabon Rovers and Plasmadoc in 1873, and the club was often referred to as the Plasmadoc Club from 1874 up until 1876.

The name Druids does not appear in the local press until January 1876. By 1877 the club were commonly referred to as Druids Football Club.

The club were allowed to play at Plasmadoc Park by George Hammond Whalley MP. However following his death in 1878 Druids lost the use of the Plasmadoc Ground. Because of this, Druids were forced to withdraw form the 1878–79 edition of the Welsh Cup.

This meant Druids could no longer play home games, which resulted in many players, including Llewelyn Kenrick, leaving the club. The club briefly folded and did not play any further games until November 1879.

After World War I, Druids FC ceased to exist when they merged with Rhosymedre to form Rhosymedre Druids. Furthermore Rhosymedre Druids subsequently merged with Acrefair United in 1929 to form Druids United.

Druids United existed in the local Welsh National League until 1992 when they merged with another local club Cefn Albion to form the current club Cefn Druids AFC.

The club is nicknamed 'The Ancients'. This originates with Druids FC being referred to as 'The Ancient Britons' in multiple historical sources as far back as 1893.

Seasons

Key

Honours

References 

Football clubs in Wales
Sport in Wrexham County Borough
Football clubs in Wrexham